The 2008 US Open is the second year of a darts tournament, organized by the Professional Darts Corporation (PDC). It was played at the Mohegan Sun Casino Resort, Connecticut, USA between May 16 and May 18, 2008.

Phil Taylor successfully defended his title.

Television coverage and format
The event was broadcast on Nuts TV in the UK from the last 16 onwards.

The tournament was open to PDPA members and citizens and Green Card holders from the USA and Canada. The elimination tournament was played down to the last 16 on the Friday and the last 16 played off on Saturday. The quarter-finals onwards took place on Sunday.

In addition, the PDC also staged the $50,000 North American Darts Championship on the 16th and 17 May.

Tournament Review

Friday 16th May

Five American players made it through to the last 16 as there were a series of shock results on the opening day of the event. The biggest shock was when Gary Mawson beat world number one and five-time former World Champion, Raymond van Barneveld in the last 32. Current World Champion, John Part went out in round two to Roger Carter who also progressed to the last 16. Bill Davis beat Tony Eccles to reach Saturday's main stage competition. David Fatum and Ray Carver completed the American line-up of five in the last 16.

World number four, Terry Jenkins also suffered a surprise defeat at the hands of Paul Lim, the man who achieved the first ever World Championship nine darter in 1990. World number seven, Andy Hamilton, was beaten in the third round by Buddy Lessig. Number three seed, James Wade withdrew from the event due to illness. Out of the top 8 seeds, only two, Phil Taylor and Roland Scholten, made it to the last 16.

Saturday 17th May

The fifth round action opened with David Fatum being the first player and first American to reach the quarter finals, beating out fellow countryman Bill Davis. Davis however did save some face with a 164 checkout, the highest of the night. Roger Carter was another American player to lose out, to Chris Mason. Mark Dudbridge also put on an impressive display in beating Dave Honey in straight sets.

Veteran Dennis Priestley moved into the quarters, dropping only one leg against Adrian Gray. Phil Taylor continued his imposing form, averaging 107 against Colin Osborne, who did take a set out of 'The Power'. American Gary Mawson, who had earlier knocked out the number one seed Raymond van Barneveld, lost 3–1 to Blackpool's Ronnie Baxter, and Colin Lloyd also looked to be in menacing form, not dropping a leg against world number eight Roland Scholten. The biggest shock of the night came with America's Ray Carver beating Wayne Mardle 3–1 in a high quality match including a 131 checkout from Carver.

Results
Total Prize Fund £126,000 (unchanged from 2007)

Scores after player's names are three-dart averages (total points scored divided by darts thrown and multiplied by 3)

Earlier rounds

Preliminary round
Jerry Hall 3–0 Kurt Tyson
Joe Chaney 3–0 Michael Mitchell

First round

Second round

Third round
Losers £1,000

Fourth round
Losers £1,500

North American Darts Championship

For the first time the PDC staged a large tournament available only to citizens and Green Card holders from the USA and Canada. The tournament was worth $50,000, with $15,000 going to the winner. It was played separately from the US Open on the 16th and 17 May, though players could enter for both tournaments. Darin Young, who had been knocked out in the first round of the US Open, emerged the victor.

On the first night the main shock was the defeat of World Champion and number one seed John Part, who was beaten by Buddy Lessig in the third round. The number two seed, Gerry Convery, also lost in the second round to Paul Lim. Leading American and third seed Ray Carver was defeated in the fifth round by Brad Wethington and John Kuczynski was beaten in the quarters by Brian Blake.

The second night saw the semi-finals and final being played out. Number eight seed Darin Young beat out Bill Davis in a close 7–5 game in the first semi-final, while Brad Wethington just beat Chris White in a 7–6 affair. The final followed suit. Wethington missed a dart to win the title before Young came back to win 8–7 and claim the title. Young said it was 'the biggest win of [his] career'. That moment was dubbed the 'most interesting' part of the Championship.

References

External links
Planet Darts US Open news
North American Darts Championship Day 1
North American Darts Championship Day 2

US Open (darts)
US Open Darts